Maria Dzieża (born 26 May 1949) is a Polish rower. She competed in the women's quadruple sculls event at the 1980 Summer Olympics.

References

1949 births
Living people
Polish female rowers
Olympic rowers of Poland
Rowers at the 1980 Summer Olympics
People from Lesser Poland Voivodeship